The stylomandibular ligament is the thickened posterior portion of the investing cervical fascia around the neck. It extends from near the apex of the styloid process of the temporal bone to the angle and posterior border of the angle of the mandible, between the masseter muscle and medial pterygoid muscle. The stylomandibular ligament limits mandibular movements, such as preventing excessive opening.

Structure 
The stylomandibular ligament extends from near the apex of the styloid process of the temporal bone to the angle and posterior border of the angle of the mandible, between the masseter muscle and medial pterygoid muscle. From its deep surface, some fibers of the styloglossus muscle originate. Although classed among the ligaments of the temporomandibular joint, it can only be considered as accessory to it.

Function 
The stylomandibular ligament, along with the sphenomandibular ligament, limits mandibular movements, such as preventing excessive opening.

Clinical significance 
The stylomandibular ligament is important for maintaining stability of the mandible after maxillofacial surgery.

References

External links 
 

Ligaments of the head and neck